Tula Oblast (Tulskaya oblast) is a federal subject (an oblast) of Russia.

Tula is the largest city and the capital of Tula Oblast.

Tula Oblast borders Moscow Oblast in the north, Ryazan Oblast in the east, Lipetsk Oblast in the southeast, Oryol Oblast in the southwest, and Kaluga Oblast in the west. Tula Oblast is one of the most developed and urbanized territories in Russia, and the majority of the territory forms the Tula-Novomoskovsk Agglomeration, an urban area with a population of over 1 million.

History

The Tula Oblast area has been inhabited since the Stone Age, as shown by discoveries of burial mounds (kurgans) and old settlements. By the eighth century, these lands were occupied by the Vyatichi, an East Slavic tribe who cultivated the land, traded, and worked at crafts, confirmed by records in property registers which mention an "ancient settlement" located at the confluence of the Upa River and Tulitsa River. The first mention of the city of Tula in 1146 is found in the Nikon Chronicle, in reference to the campaign of Prince Svyatoslav Olgovich of Chernigov. At the time the lands belonged to the Ryazan Principality, and Prince Sviatoslav passed through a number of settlements, including Tula, while heading for Ryazan.

Geography
Tula Oblast is located in Russia's Central Federal District and borders Moscow, Ryazan, Lipetsk, Oryol, and Kaluga Oblasts.

Rivers
Tula Oblast contains more than 1,600 rivers and streams.  Major rivers include:
Don River
Oka River
Upa River

Natural resources
The oblast is rich in iron ore, clay, limestone, and deposits of lignite (coal). The lignite deposit is part of the Moscow coal basin.

Climate
Tula Oblast has a moderate continental climate, with warm summers and cold winters.

Politics

During the Soviet period, the high authority in the oblast was shared between three persons: The first secretary of the Tula CPSU Committee (who in reality had the biggest authority), the chairman of the oblast Soviet (legislative power), and the Chairman of the oblast Executive Committee (executive power). Since 1991, CPSU lost all the power, and the head of the Oblast administration, and eventually the governor was appointed/elected alongside elected regional parliament.

The Charter of Tula Oblast is the fundamental law of the region. The Tula Oblast Duma is the province's standing legislative (representative) body. The Oblast Duma exercises its authority by passing laws, resolutions, and other legal acts and by supervising the implementation and observance of the laws and other legal acts passed by it. The highest executive body is the Oblast Government, which includes territorial executive bodies such as district administrations, committees, and commissions that facilitate development and run the day to day matters of the province. The Oblast administration supports the activities of the Governor who is the highest official and acts as guarantor of the observance of the oblast Charter in accordance with the Constitution of Russia.

Administrative divisions

Demographics
Population:

Settlements

Ethnic composition (2010):
Russians - 95.3%
Ukrainians - 1%
Armenians - 0.6%
Tatars - 0.5%
Azeris - 0.4%
Romani people - 0.3%
Belarusians - 0.2%
Germans - 0.2%
Others - 1.5%
19,778 people were registered from administrative databases, and could not declare an ethnicity. It is estimated that the proportion of ethnicities in this group is the same as that of the declared group.
2002 Census population:
Urban: 1,366,818 (81.6%)
Rural: 308,940 (18.4%)
Males: 755,057 (45.1%)
Females: 920,701 (54.9%)
Females per 1000 Males: 1219
Average age : 41.7 years
Urban : 41.5 years
Rural : 42.8 years
Male : 37.8 years
Female : 44.9 years

2012
Births: 15 499 (10.1 per 1000)
Deaths: 27 197 (17.7 per 1000) 
Total fertility rate:
2009 - 1.31 | 2010 - 1.31 | 2011 - 1.32 | 2012 - 1.43 | 2013 - 1.42 | 2014 - 1.47 | 2015 - 1.57 | 2016 - 1.56(e)

Religion

According to a 2012 survey 62% of the population of Tula Oblast adheres to the Russian Orthodox Church, 2% are unaffiliated generic Christians, 1% are Muslims. In addition, 19% of the population declares to be "spiritual but not religious", 13% is atheist, and 3% follows other religions or did not give an answer to the question.

Economy
Tula Oblast is part of the Central economic region. It is a prominent industrial center with metalworking, engineering, coalmining, and chemical industries.  Major industrial cities include Novomoskovsk and Aleksin.  Historical industries, such as firearm, samovar, and accordion manufacturing, still play an important role in the region.

The oblast also has a developed agricultural sector, which ranks 33rd in Russia in agricultural production.  The sector includes farming grain (wheat and rye), potatoes, sugar beets, and vegetable growing, livestock raising, and dairying.

Culture

Tula Oblast has more than 100 museums. Several are located in the administrative center of the oblast, the city of Tula, notably the Tula State Arms Museum, the Tula Kremlin, and the Tula Samovar Museum. Another important cultural tourist attractions is the home and country estate of Leo Tolstoy, Yasnaya Polyana, located  outside of the city of Tula.

The oblast also has four professional theaters, a philharmonic orchestra, and a circus.

See also
List of Chairmen of the Tula Oblast Duma
2005 Moscow power blackouts
Tula Arms Plant
Tula Governorate

References

External links

Official website of the Museum-Estate of Leo Tolstoy "Yasnaya Polyana"

 
States and territories established in 1937
1937 establishments in the Soviet Union